Gabriela Žilková Hrázská (born 21 July 1979) is a Czech former competitive ice dancer. With Jiří Procházka, she is the 1999 Czech national champion and placed sixth at the 1998 World Junior Championships. She is currently a coach and choreographer. She has worked with the following skaters:

 Anna Dušková / Martin Bidař
 Anna Dušková
 Petr Kotlařík
 Jan Kurnik
 Gabriela Kubová / Dmitri Kiselev
 Nikola Višňová / Lukáš Csolley
 Klára Kadlecová / Petr Bidař
 Kamila Hájková / David Vincour
 Anaïs Morand / Antoine Dorsaz
 Eliška Březinová
 Kristína Kostková
 Ivana Buzková

Competitive highlights 
(with Procházka)

References 

1979 births
Czech female ice dancers
Czech figure skating coaches
Living people
Figure skaters from Brno
Female sports coaches